Oculomancy (from the Latin oculus, "eye") is a form of scrying where the diviner gazes into the questioners' eyes and reads the reflections.

References

Divination